Amanda Stinson (born 17 November 1965) is an English cricketer and former member of the England women's cricket team who played as a wicket-keeper. She played four test matches and five one day internationals, in 1986 and 1987. She played domestic cricket for Yorkshire.

References

External links
 
 

Living people
England women Test cricketers
England women One Day International cricketers
1965 births
Cricketers from Sheffield
Yorkshire women cricketers
Wicket-keepers